Eric Stokes may refer to:
 Eric Stokes (composer) (1930–1999), American composer
 Eric Thomas Stokes (1924–1981), historian of South Asia
 Eric Stokes (American football executive) (born 1973), American football scout, executive and former defensive back
 Eric Stokes (cornerback) (born 1999), American football cornerback